Duncan is a town in Greenlee County, Arizona, United States. As of the 2010 census, the population of the town was 696. In 2018 the estimated population was 789.

The town limits are on both sides of the Gila, but the primary portion of the town and the entire downtown area lie on the south side of the river. Duncan was founded in the mid 19th century, and the land was added to the United States as a part of the Mexican Cession. The town of Duncan has been destroyed twice by flood and once by fire.

The town and area are primarily populated by ranchers and miners (especially from the Freeport-McMoran copper mines in southeastern Arizona and southwestern New Mexico). Surrounding smaller towns such as Franklin and York in Arizona and Virden, New Mexico, use Duncan public works and public schools. The Duncan area along the Gila River is renowned for Native American artifacts such as arrow heads, pottery, burial sites, cave paintings and other remnants of the Anasazi and other pre-historic cultures, as well as artifacts from garrison camps of the expedition of Francisco Vázquez de Coronado.

Duncan High School (mascot: Wildkats; school colors: red, grey, and white) competes in many sports, but is renowned for their football team.

U.S. Supreme Court Justice Sandra Day O'Connor was born in El Paso, Texas, but grew up near Duncan on the Lazy B ranch, which straddles the border between Arizona and New Mexico. The Day family ran the ranch for many years until selling it; it continues to be run as a ranch. O'Connor later wrote a book titled Lazy B: Growing up on a Cattle Ranch in the American Southwest about her childhood experiences on the ranch with her brother H. Alan Day.

Geography
Duncan is located in southern Greenlee County at  (32.725828, -109.097686). U.S. Route 70 passes through downtown, leading west  to Safford, Arizona, and southeast  to Lordsburg, New Mexico, and Interstate 10. Arizona State Route 75 leads north from Duncan  to Clifton.

Climate
Duncan has a semi-arid climate (Köppen climate classification BSk) with huge diurnal temperature ranges year-round except during periods of thundery monsoon weather.

Rainfall is generally scanty outside of the monsoon season, with substantial falls from winter storms being very rare, although December 1991 did see  of rain. Snowfall is most unusual, with the median being zero and the mean only . The most snowfall ever in Duncan was  during the record Western cold wave of January 1949.

Demographics

As of the census of 2000, there were 812 people, 294 households, and 206 families residing in the town. The racial makeup of the town was 81.8% White, 0.5% Black or African American, 0.9% Native American, 0.1% Asian, 13.6% from other races, and 3.2% from two or more races. 31.5% of the population were Hispanic or Latino of any race.

There were 294 households, out of which 42.2% had children under the age of 18 living with them, 46.3% were married couples living together, 17.7% had a female householder with no husband present, and 29.6% were non-families. 25.9% of all households were made up of individuals, and 12.9% had someone living alone who was 65 years of age or older. The average household size was 2.76 and the average family size was 3.33.

In the town, the population was spread out, with 35.2% under the age of 18, 10.6% from 18 to 24, 22.2% from 25 to 44, 21.2% from 45 to 64, and 10.8% who were 65 years of age or older. The median age was 28 years. For every 100 females, there were 90.6 males. For every 100 females age 18 and over, there were 91.3 males.

The median income for a household in the town was $27,368, and the median income for a family was $33,750. Males had a median income of $32,232 versus $18,333 for females. The per capita income for the town was $13,642. About 14.0% of families and 16.5% of the population were below the poverty line, including 17.4% of those under age 18 and 23.2% of those age 65 or over.

Transportation

Greyhound Lines serves Duncan on its Phoenix–El Paso via Globe route.

References

External links
 Town of Duncan official website

Towns in Greenlee County, Arizona
Safford, Arizona micropolitan area